Gualdo is a comune (municipality) in the Province of Macerata in the Italian region Marche, located about  southwest of Ancona and about  southwest of Macerata.

Gualdo borders the following municipalities: Amandola, Penna San Giovanni, San Ginesio, Sant'Angelo in Pontano, Sarnano.

It is between the Salino and Tenonacola Rivers, where the first inhabitants fled in the fourth century from the barbarians invasions.

The medieval castle of Gualdo belongs to the Bonifazi of Monte San Martino then to the Brunforte. After a brief period of peace feuds started with the Varano and then the Sforza.

Parts of the castle walls and towers remain visible in the 21st century.

Attractions

The bell tower was built in the fourteenth century and was changed to a mechanical clock in 1850. Built by Pietro Mei of Montecarotto. It was restored in the 21st century. The parish church of San Savino was built with a Greek cross layout and a central dome. The church houses a Gonfalone del Rosario by Alessandro Ricci, and paintings depicting a Last Supper by Ubaldo Ricci and a Madonna with St Savino by Antonio Liozzi.

Adjacent to the parish church is the centre for Romolo Muri (1870–1944), dedicated to the founder of the Christian Democratic Party. The library and archives are available to scholars and researchers, and for conferences and seminars.

At the end of the avenue Vittorio Veneto is the church of the Madonna. It was once attached to a Franciscan convent, that now serves as nursing home. The 12th century Madonna delle Grazie is a Catholic Marian shrine.

Demographic evolution

References

Cities and towns in the Marche